Horst Skoff (22 August 1968 – 7 June 2008) was a professional tennis player from Austria, who won four tournaments at the top-level.

Biography
Skoff was born in Klagenfurt, Austria, and started playing tennis at age 6. In 1984 he won the singles title at the 16-and-under category of the Orange Bowl. He turned professional in 1985. Skoff won his first top-level singles title in 1988 at Athens. Over the course of his career he won four top-level singles titles and two tour doubles titles. His career-high rankings were world No. 18 in singles and world No. 70 in doubles. His career prize money totalled US$1,651,858.

Skoff played on Austria's Davis Cup team for nine years, compiling a 22–17 win–loss record. He helped the team reach the World Group semi-finals in 1990. Memorable Davis Cup rubbers which Skoff was involved in include a five-set win over world No. 2 Mats Wilander in the 1989 quarterfinal that lasted more than six hours; and a five-set loss to Michael Chang in the 1990 semifinal.

Despite Skoff's relative success during his career of winning four top-level tournaments, his memorable Davis Cup moments, and reaching a career high world ranking of 18 in singles competition, he never managed to progress beyond the second round at any Grand Slam event.

Skoff played in his last top-level tournament in August 1995, at the San Marino Open. From 1996–1999, due to his lower world ranking, Skoff played in challenger and futures tournaments. He retired in August 1999, after playing his last match in Sylt, Germany.

Skoff died on 7 June 2008 in Hamburg, Germany, following a heart attack at age 39.

Career finals

Singles (4 wins, 7 losses)

Doubles (2 wins, 4 losses)

Singles performance timeline

Top 10 wins

References

External links 
 
 
 

1968 births
2008 deaths
Austrian male tennis players
Hopman Cup competitors
Olympic tennis players of Austria
Sportspeople from Klagenfurt
Tennis players at the 1988 Summer Olympics
Tennis players at the 1992 Summer Olympics